After Hours is a 1979 American crime novel written by Edwin Torres and is the sequel to Carlito's Way (1975).  Both novels served as the basis of the 1993 Brian De Palma film Carlito's Way.

Plot
An ex-con, Carlito Brigante, tries one more round in the rackets before going straight.

References

External links
Google Books

1979 American novels
Carlito's Way
Sequel novels
American novels adapted into films
Dial Press books